Amathinidae,  is a taxonomic family mostly consisting of small and minute sea snails, marine heterobranch gastropod molluscs or micromolluscs in the superfamily Pyramidelloidea.

Together with Pyramidellidae, Ebalidae, Turbonillidae, Odostomidae and other genera they form the superfamily Pyramidelloidea.

Little is known on the biology of the group, but some data on the anatomy and systematic position is given by Ponder (1987) and Huber (1993).

1999 taxonomy 
Genera within the family Amathinidae according to the taxonomy of Schander, Van Aartsen & Corgan (1999) include:
Genus Amathina J. E. Gray, 1842
Genus Amathinoides Sacco, 1896
Genus Carinorbis Conrad, 1862
Genus Cyclothyca Stearns, 1861
Genus Faluniella Cossman, 1921
Genus Iselica Dall, 1918
Genus Leucotina A. Adams, 1860
Genus Phasianema Wood, 1842
Genus Plicifer H. Adams, 1868

2005 taxonomy 
This family has no subfamilies.

Genera
This family presently comprises less than 100 recent and fossil species divided into seven genera: Amathina, Amathinoides, Carinorbis, Cyclothyca, Iselica, Leucotina and Phasianema.

Two additional genera, Faluniella and Plicifer may also be a part of Amathinidae:
 Faluniella Cossmann, 1921

Genera within the family Amathinidae include:
 Amathina Gray, 1842
 Cyclothyca Stearns, 1891
 Iselica Dall, 1918
 Leucotina A. Adams, 1860
 Monotygma G. B. Sowerby II, 1839
 Plicifer H. Adams, 1868
 † Raulinia Mayer, 1864 
Genera brought into synonymy
 Adelactaeon Cossmann, 1895: synonym of Leucotina A. Adams, 1860
 Amathinoides Sacco, 1896 † accepted as Clathrella Récluz, 1864 accepted as Carinorbis Conrad, 1862
 Clathrella Récluz, 1864 accepted as Carinorbis Conrad, 1862
 Isapis H. Adams & A. Adams, 1854 accepted as Iselica Dall, 1918 (Invalid: junior homonym of Isapis Doubleday, 1847 [Lepidoptera]; Iselica is a replacement name)
 Myonia A. Adams, 1860: synonym of Leucotina A. Adams, 1860

Anatomy
The shells are usually flat without coiling. They usually have strong axial ribs. Ponder described giant neurons in the cerebral ganglion.

References

 Ponder, W. F. (1987). The anatomy and relationships of the pyramidellacean limpet, Amathina tricarinata (Mollusca: Gastropoda). Asian Marine Biology. 4: 1–34

External links 

 Bouchet, P. & Rocroi, J.-P. (2005). Classification and nomenclator of gastropod families. Malacologia. 47 (1–2): 1-397

 
Taxa named by Winston Ponder